William Benjamin Daniel (January 14, 1840 – June 12, 1921) was an American politician who served in the Virginia House of Delegates.

References

External links 

1840 births
1921 deaths
Members of the Virginia House of Delegates
20th-century American politicians